Justice Magruder may refer to:

Benjamin Drake Magruder (1838–1910), chief justice of the Illinois Supreme Court
Daniel Randall Magruder (1835–1915), judge of the Maryland Court of Appeals
Alexander Contee Magruder (c. 1779–1853), judge of the Maryland Court of Appeals